Ragdolly Anna was a British children's television series, produced by Yorkshire Television and Siriol Productions and based on the books by British writer Jean Kenward.  The show was broadcast between 1982-1987 on the ITV network during its Children's ITV strand.
The show starred Pat Coombs and was about a small stuffed doll named Ragdolly Anna that used to spring into life when nobody was watching and would go on many wild and fantastic adventures.  The programme was filmed in the Woolman Street Tenements in the Mabgate area of Leeds.

Series guide

Series 1: 6 editions first shown from 26 July 1982 to 6 September 1982
Series 2: 12 editions first shown from 9 January 1986 to 27 March 1986
Series 3: 12 editions first shown from 6 April 1987 to 13 July 1987

International releases

 Kenya
KBC
 Germany
BFBS (Children's SSVC)
SSVC Television (Children's SSVC)
 Singapore
Mediacorp Channel 5 (Kids' Corner)
 Canada
Access Network
 Brunei
RTB
 USA
Public Access 31 (in Bedford, Indiana)
 New Zealand
TV One
Channel 2

External links

Television series by Yorkshire Television
ITV children's television shows
1982 British television series debuts
1987 British television series endings
1980s British children's television series
Television series by ITV Studios
English-language television shows
British television shows featuring puppetry